Zamia manicata is a species of plant in the family Zamiaceae. It is found in Colombia (Choco Department and Antioquia Department) and Panama (Darien Province). Its natural habitat is subtropical or tropical moist lowland forests. It is threatened by habitat loss.

References

manicata
Near threatened plants
Taxonomy articles created by Polbot